Khavashod Rural District is a rural district (dehestan) in Rud Ab District, Sabzevar County, Razavi Khorasan Province, Iran. At the 2006 census, its population was 4,779, in 1,510 families.  The rural district has 28 villages.

References 

Rural Districts of Razavi Khorasan Province
Sabzevar County